Ernest Ward was an English professional rugby league footballer who played in the 1900s. He played at representative level for England, and at club level for Halifax.

International honours
Ernest Ward won a cap for England while at Halifax in 1909 against Australia.

References

19th-century births
20th-century deaths
England national rugby league team players
English rugby league players
Halifax R.L.F.C. players
Place of birth missing
Place of death missing